Almost-a-Dog Mountain is located in the Lewis Range, Glacier National Park in the U.S. state of Montana.  The mountain is named for a Blackfoot warrior Almost A Dog or Imazí-imita who was a survivor of the 1870 Marias Massacre.  Although his entire family perished in the attack, he survived but was crippled for life.  He also survived the so-called Winter of Starvation in 1883–84.

See also
 List of mountains and mountain ranges of Glacier National Park (U.S.)

References

External links
 
 Almost-a-Dog Mountain photo: Flickr

Mountains of Glacier County, Montana
Mountains of Glacier National Park (U.S.)
Lewis Range
Mountains of Montana